St. Mary's School, Pune, India, was founded in 1866 to cater to the education of the daughters of officers of the British Indian Army who were posted to Pune. From 1866 to 1977, the school was run by the Sisters of the Community of St Mary the Virgin, an Anglican order based in Wantage, England. In 2019, a list made by EduWorld showed that St. Mary's School, Pune was the 7th best all-girls day school in India.It recently celebrated 150 years of establishment.

In 1977 it was decided at Wantage to hand over the school to secular administrators because as times had changed: the increased administrative work involved in running a school was felt by the community felt to be incompatible with their religious life. Elizabeth Matthew who had been a senior English teacher with the school since 1973, had been appointed Vice-Principal in June 1976. The Sisters withdrew from the School and Matthew took over as Principal. The enrolment went from 840 students to 2700. The Indian Certificate of Secondary Education results every year were outstanding, with no failures, and 90% of the students securing over 75%.

In June 1992, Matthew started a Boys' school, with one division of each class, from Upper Kindergarten to Standard X. The Boys' school is run on the same lines as the Girls' school, except for their timings. The girls work from 7:30 a.m to 2:10 p.m and the boys from 7:20 a.m to 1:55 p.m.

In March 2006, Matthew was appointed as executive director of the school; Jessica Simoes, who had been in charge of the Boys' School, took her place as Principal.

In the year 2009, St. Mary's Junior College, a co-educational institution training students to appear for the all-India Indian School Certificate examination in the Commerce and Science streams, was created. The Junior College occupies the same campus as the Boys' section but is conducted during different hours.

Matthew died of cancer on 13 April 2009, after which the post of executive director was abolished.

In the academic year 2010/2011, Simoes was replaced as Principal by Sujata Mallic Kumar.

The school is affiliated to the all-India Indian Certificate of Secondary Education, New Delhi.

The school has an active Robotics program for students.  The student teams participate in FIRST Tech Challenge (FTC) and FIRST Lego League (FLL).  In 2012, the school FTC team, SM Tech, won the National championship and went to the FIRST Championship in St. Louis, USA.  In 2013, an all girls team, Electrohephathenix, represented the school at the first Asia Pacific Invitational held at Sydney, Australia

Funding and admissions
A private institution, St. Mary's School is entirely dependent for funding on school fees. Christian principles form the foundation and it is registered as a major school. However, admissions are open to children of all communities.

Results

Students from the school consistently secure more than 90% in the ICSE. In the 2010 ICSE examinations, the highest percentage in the school (best of 4 + English) was 98.4%, the second highest in India. Out of the total of 223 students (179 girls and 44 boys) who appeared for the examination that year, 161 students secured more than 90% (132 girls and 29 boys). In the 2013 ICSE examinations, two girls from the school, Simran Khanuja and Anika Agrawal, were the All-India I.C.S.E. toppers, securing a staggering 98.4%. Once again in the 2021-22 ICSE examinations, Hargun Matharu was an All-India topper with a stupendous 99.89%.

Students from the Junior College have also performed well in the last four years with most students obtaining above 80 or 90%.

Notable people
Natasha Poonawalla
Lillete Dubey
Nishita Nirmal Mhatre
Nikita Anand

See also 
List of schools in Pune
The Bishop's School, Pune

References

External links

High schools and secondary schools in Maharashtra
Schools in Pune
1866 establishments in India
Educational institutions established in 1866
Schools in Colonial India